Hak Dini Kur'an Dili (English: The Truth [God]'s Religion Quran's language) written by Muhammed Hamdi Yazır, Turkish Islamic theologian born in Antalya, Turkey. Hak Dini Kur'an Dili was ordered by Mustafa Kemal Atatürk. It is the first Qur'an translation in Modern Turkish.

See also
 Quran
 Islam

References

Quran translations
Turkish language
Maturidi literature